Salem School District  is a public school district based in Salem, Fulton County, Arkansas, United States. The district serves more than 700 students by employing more than 110 faculty and staff serving its two schools and district offices.

The school district encompasses  of land serving all or portions of Mammoth Spring, Sturkie, Viola, Glencoe, Ash Flat, Horseshoe Bend, and Camp.

Schools 
 Salem High School, serving grades 7 through 12.
 Salem Elementary School, serving kindergarten through grade 6.

References

External links
 

Education in Fulton County, Arkansas
School districts in Arkansas